Ludmila Georgiyevna Velikova (née Sinitsina, ; born November 4, 1947 in Leningrad) is a  Russian pair skating coach and former competitor.

Ludmila Sinitsina, now known as Velikova, competed with her husband Nikolai Velikov, placing fifth at the Soviet Championships. Velikov later retired from competitive skating and became the coach of his wife with Anatoly Yevdokimov, a team who won bronze medals at the 1972 USSR Cup and 1973 RSFSR.

After the end of her career, Velikova also turned to coaching pairs alongside her husband. Based in Saint Petersburg, Russia.

Their current students include:
 Kseniia Akhanteva / Valerii Kolesov

Their former students include:
 Anastasia Mishina / Aleksandr Galiamov
 Anastasia Mishina / Vladislav Mirzoev
 Polina Kostiukovich / Dmitrii Ialin
 Ksenia Stolbova / Fedor Klimov
 Maria Petrova and Alexei Tikhonov
 Maria Mukhortova / Maxim Trankov
 Evgenia Shishkova / Vadim Naumov
 Maria Petrova / Anton Sikharulidze
 Ekaterina Vasilieva / Alexander Smirnov
 Julia Obertas / Alexei Sokolov
 Julia Obertas / Sergei Slavnov

Awards 
 Master of Sports of the USSR
 Honored Coach of Russia

References 

1947 births
Living people
Soviet female pair skaters
Russian figure skating coaches
Figure skaters from Saint Petersburg
Female sports coaches